Aghabala Ramazanov (born 20 January 1993) is an Azerbaijani professional footballer who plays as a forward for Azerbaijan Premier League club Sabail. He is the brother of Zaur Ramazanov.

Career

Club
In June 2015, Ramazanov moved from Khazar Lankaran FK to Sumgayit FK.

On 24 May 2018, Qarabağ announced that Ramazanov had been released by the club following expiration of his contract. On 26 May 2018, Sabail FK announced the signing of Ramazanov.

On 24 May 2018, Ramazanov signed 1.5 years contract with Zira FK Ramazanov left Zira at the end of May 2022.

Personal life
Aghabala is the younger brother of retired Azerbaijan international footballer Zaur.

Career statistics

Club

International

Statistics accurate as of match played 16 November 2019

International goals

Honours

Club
Neftchi Baku
 Azerbaijan Premier League (1): 2011–2012

Qarabag
 Azerbaijan Premier League (1): 2016–17

Khazar Lankaran
 Azerbaijan Supercup (1): 2013

International
Azerbaijan U23
 Islamic Solidarity Games: (1) 2017

References

External links 
 

1993 births
Living people
Footballers from Baku
Association football forwards
Azerbaijani footballers
Azerbaijan youth international footballers
Azerbaijan international footballers
Azerbaijan Premier League players
Neftçi PFK players
Khazar Lankaran FK players
Sumgayit FK players
Shamakhi FK players
Qarabağ FK players
Sabail FK players
Zira FK players